Bath is a city in the Bath and North East Somerset unitary area in the county of Somerset, England, known for and named after its Roman-built baths. At the 2021 Census, the population was 101,557. The city became a World Heritage Site in 1987, and was later added to the transnational World Heritage Site known as the "Great Spa Towns of Europe" in 2021. Bath is also the largest city and settlement in Somerset.

The city became a spa with the Latin name  ("the waters of Sulis")  60 AD when the Romans built baths and a temple in the valley of the River Avon, although hot springs were known even before then.

Bath Abbey was founded in the 7th century and became a religious centre; the building was rebuilt in the 12th and 16th centuries. In the 17th century, claims were made for the curative properties of water from the springs, and Bath became popular as a spa town in the Georgian era. Georgian architecture, crafted from Bath stone, includes the Royal Crescent, Circus, Pump Room and Assembly Rooms where Beau Nash presided over the city's social life from 1705 until his death in 1761.

Many of the streets and squares were laid out by John Wood, the Elder, and in the 18th century the city became fashionable and the population grew. Jane Austen lived in Bath in the early 19th century. Further building was undertaken in the 19th century and following the Bath Blitz in World War II. Bath became part of the county of Avon in 1974, and, following Avon's abolition in 1996, has been the principal centre of Bath and North East Somerset.

Bath has over 6 million yearly visitors, making it one of ten English cities visited most by overseas tourists. Attractions include the spas, canal boat tours, Royal Crescent, Bath Skyline, Parade Gardens and Royal Victoria Park which hosts carnivals and seasonal events. Shopping areas include SouthGate shopping centre, the Corridor arcade and artisan shops at Walcot, Milsom, Stall and York Streets. There are theatres, including the Theatre Royal, as well as several museums including the Museum of Bath Architecture, the Victoria Art Gallery, the Museum of East Asian Art, the Herschel Museum of Astronomy, Fashion Museum, and the Holburne Museum. The city has two universities – the University of Bath and Bath Spa University – with Bath College providing further education. Sporting clubs from the city include Bath Rugby and Bath City. It is also home to software, publishing and service-oriented industries such as Future plc and Rotork.

History

Stone, Bronze, and Iron Ages
The hills in the locality such as Bathampton Down saw human activity from the Mesolithic period. Several Bronze Age round barrows were opened by John Skinner in the 18th century. A long barrow site believed to be from the Early Bronze Age Beaker people was flattened to make way for RAF Charmy Down. Solsbury Hill overlooking the current city was an Iron Age hill fort and the adjacent Bathampton Camp may also have been one.

Roman baths and town

Archaeological evidence shows that the site of the Roman baths' main spring may have been treated as a shrine by the Britons, and was dedicated to the goddess Sulis, whom the Romans identified with Minerva; the name Sulis continued to be used after the Roman invasion, appearing in the town's Roman name,  (literally, "the waters of Sulis"). Messages to her scratched onto metal, known as curse tablets, have been recovered from the sacred spring by archaeologists. The tablets were written in Latin, and cursed people whom the writers felt had wronged them. For example, if a citizen had his clothes stolen at the baths, he might write a curse, naming the suspects, on a tablet to be read by the goddess.

A temple was constructed in AD 60–70, and a bathing complex was built up over the next 300 years. Engineers drove oak piles into the mud to provide a stable foundation, and surrounded the spring with an irregular stone chamber lined with lead. In the 2nd century, the spring was enclosed within a wooden barrel-vaulted structure that housed the caldarium (hot bath), tepidarium (warm bath), and frigidarium (cold bath).

The town was later given defensive walls, probably in the 3rd century. After the failure of Roman authority in the first decade of the 5th century, the baths fell into disrepair and were eventually lost as a result of rising water levels and silting.

In March 2012, a hoard of 30,000 silver Roman coins, one of the largest discovered in Britain, was unearthed in an archaeological dig.

Post-Roman and medieval

Bath may have been the site of the Battle of Badon ( 500 AD), in which Arthur, the hero of later legends, is said to have defeated the Anglo-Saxons. The town was captured by the West Saxons in 577 after the Battle of Deorham; the Anglo-Saxon poem The Ruin may describe the appearance of the Roman site about this time. A monastery was founded at an early date – reputedly by Saint David although more probably in 675 by Osric, King of the Hwicce, perhaps using the walled area as its precinct. Nennius, a 9th-century historian, mentions a "Hot Lake" in the land of the Hwicce along the River Severn, and adds "It is surrounded by a wall, made of brick and stone, and men may go there to bathe at any time, and every man can have the kind of bath he likes. If he wants, it will be a cold bath; and if he wants a hot bath, it will be hot". Bede described hot baths in the geographical introduction to the Ecclesiastical History in terms very similar to those of Nennius. King Offa of Mercia gained control of the monastery in 781 and rebuilt the church, which was dedicated to St. Peter.

According to the Victorian churchman Edward Churton, during the Anglo-Saxon era Bath was known as Acemannesceastre ('Akemanchester'), or 'aching men's city', on account of the reputation these springs had for healing the sick.

By the 9th century, the old Roman street pattern was lost and Bath was a royal possession. King Alfred laid out the town afresh, leaving its south-eastern quadrant as the abbey precinct. During the reign of Edward the Elder coins were minted in Bath based on a design from the Winchester mint but with 'BAD' on the obverse relating to the Anglo-Saxon name for the town, Baðum, Baðan or Baðon, meaning "at the baths", and this was the source of the present name. Edgar of England was crowned king of England in Bath Abbey in 973, in a ceremony that formed the basis of all future English coronations.

William Rufus granted the town, abbey and mint to a royal physician, John of Tours, who became Bishop of Wells and Abbot of Bath, following the sacking of the town during the Rebellion of 1088. It was papal policy for bishops to move to more urban seats, and John of Tours translated his own from Wells to Bath. The bishop planned and began a much larger church as his cathedral, to which was attached a priory, with the bishop's palace beside it. New baths were built around the three springs. Later bishops returned the episcopal seat to Wells while retaining the name Bath in the title, Bishop of Bath and Wells. St John's Hospital was founded around 1180 by Bishop Reginald Fitz Jocelin and is among the oldest almshouses in England. The 'hospital of the baths' was built beside the hot springs of the Cross Bath, for their health-giving properties and to provide shelter for the poor infirm.

Administrative systems fell within the hundreds. The Bath Hundred had various names including the Hundred of Le Buri. The Bath Foreign Hundred or Forinsecum covered the area outside the city and was later combined into the Bath Forum Hundred. Wealthy merchants had no status within the hundred courts and formed guilds to gain influence. They built the first guildhall probably in the 13th century. Around 1200, the first mayor was appointed.

Early modern

By the 15th century, Bath's abbey church was dilapidated and Oliver King, Bishop of Bath and Wells, decided to rebuild it on a smaller scale in 1500. The new church was completed just a few years before Bath Priory was dissolved in 1539 by Henry VIII. The abbey church became derelict before being restored as the city's parish church in the Elizabethan era, when the city experienced a revival as a spa. The baths were improved and the city began to attract the aristocracy. A Royal charter granted by Queen Elizabeth I in 1590 confirmed city status. Anne of Denmark came to bathe in 1613 and 1615.

During the English Civil War, the city was garrisoned for Charles I. Seven thousand pounds was spent on fortifications, but on the appearance of parliamentary forces the gates were thrown open and the city surrendered. It became a significant post for the Western Association army under William Waller. Bath was retaken by the royalists in July 1643 following the Battle of Lansdowne and occupied for two years until 1645. Luckily, the city was spared the destruction of property and starvation of its inhabitants unlike nearby Bristol and Gloucester. During the occupation, the finances of the Bath City Council took a drubbing with council spending, rents and grants all falling. The billeting of soldiers in private houses also contributed to disorder and vandalism.

Normalcy to the city quickly recovered after the war when the city council achieved a healthy budget surplus. Thomas Guidott, a student of chemistry and medicine at Wadham College, Oxford, set up a practice in the city in 1668. He was interested in the curative properties of the waters, and he wrote A discourse of Bathe, and the hot waters there. Also, Some Enquiries into the Nature of the water in 1676. It brought the health-giving properties of the hot mineral waters to the attention of the country, and the aristocracy arrived to partake in them.

Several areas of the city were developed in the Stuart period, and more building took place during Georgian times in response to the increasing number of visitors who required accommodation. Architects John Wood the Elder and his son laid out the new quarters in streets and squares, the identical façades of which gave an impression of palatial scale and classical decorum. Much of the creamy gold Bath stone, a type of limestone used for construction in the city, was obtained from the Combe Down and Bathampton Down Mines owned by Ralph Allen (1694–1764). Allen, to advertise the quality of his quarried limestone, commissioned the elder John Wood to build a country house on his Prior Park estate between the city and the mines. Allen was responsible for improving and expanding the postal service in western England, for which he held the contract for more than forty years. Although not fond of politics, Allen was a civic-minded man and a member of Bath Corporation for many years. He was elected mayor for a single term in 1742.

In the early 18th century, Bath acquired its first purpose-built theatre, the Old Orchard Street Theatre. It was rebuilt as the Theatre Royal, along with the Grand Pump Room attached to the Roman Baths and assembly rooms. Master of ceremonies Beau Nash, who presided over the city's social life from 1704 until his death in 1761, drew up a code of behaviour for public entertainments. Bath had become perhaps the most fashionable of the rapidly developing British spa towns, attracting many notable visitors such as the wealthy London bookseller Andrew Millar and his wife, who both made long visits. In 1816, it was described as "a seat of amusement and dissipation", where "scenes of extravagance in this receptacle of the wealthy and the idle, the weak and designing" were habitual.

Late modern

The population of the city was 40,020 at the 1801 census, making it one of the largest cities in Britain. William Thomas Beckford bought a house in Lansdown Crescent in 1822, and subsequently two adjacent houses to form his residence.

Emperor Haile Selassie of Ethiopia spent the four years in exile, from 1936 to 1940, at Fairfield House in Bath. During World War II, between the evening of 25 April and the early morning of 27 April 1942, Bath suffered three air raids in reprisal for RAF raids on the German cities of Lübeck and Rostock, part of the Luftwaffe campaign popularly known as the Baedeker Blitz. During the Bath Blitz, more than 400 people were killed, and more than 19,000 buildings damaged or destroyed.

Houses in Royal Crescent, Circus and Paragon were burnt out along with the Assembly Rooms. The buildings have all been restored although there are still signs of the bombing.

A postwar review of inadequate housing led to the clearance and redevelopment of areas of the city in a postwar style, often at variance with the local Georgian style. In the 1950s, the nearby villages of Combe Down, Twerton and Weston were incorporated into the city to enable the development of housing, much of it council housing. In 1965, town planner Colin Buchanan published Bath: A Planning and Transport Study, which to a large degree sought to better accommodate the motor car, including the idea of a traffic tunnel underneath the centre of Bath. Though criticised by conservationists, some parts of the plan were implemented.

In the 1970s and 1980s, it was recognised that conservation of historic buildings was inadequate, leading to more care and reuse of buildings and open spaces. In 1987, the city was selected by UNESCO as a World Heritage Site, recognising its international cultural significance.

Between 1991 and 2000, Bath was the scene of a series of rapes committed by an unidentified man dubbed the "Batman rapist". The attacker remains at large and is the subject of Britain's longest-running serial rape investigation. He is said to have a tights fetish, have a scar below his bottom lip and resides in the Bath area or knows it very well. He has also been linked to the unsolved murder of Melanie Hall, which occurred in the city in 1996. Although the offender's DNA is known and several thousand men in Bath were DNA tested, the attacker continues to evade police.

Since 2000, major developments have included the Thermae Bath Spa, the SouthGate shopping centre, the residential Western Riverside project on the Stothert & Pitt factory site, and the riverside Bath Quays office and business development. In 2021, Bath become part of a second UNESCO World Heritage Site, a group of spa towns across Europe known as the "Great Spas of Europe".

Government

Since 1996, the city has had a single tier of local government — Bath and North East Somerset Council.

Historical development
Bath had long been an ancient borough, having that status since 878 when it became a royal borough (burh) of Alfred the Great, and was reformed into a municipal borough in 1835. It has formed part of the county of Somerset since 878, when ceded to Wessex, having previously been in Mercia (the River Avon had acted as the border between the two kingdoms since 628). However, Bath was made a county borough in 1889, independent of the newly created administrative county and Somerset County Council. Bath became part of Avon when the non-metropolitan county was created in 1974, resulting in its abolition as a county borough, and instead became a non-metropolitan district with borough status.

With the abolition of Avon in 1996, the non-metropolitan district and borough were abolished too, and Bath has since been part of the unitary authority district of Bath and North East Somerset (B&NES). The unitary district included also the Wansdyke district and therefore includes a wider area than the city (the 'North East Somerset' element) including Keynsham which is home to many of the council's offices, though the council meets at the Guildhall in Bath.

Bath was returned to the ceremonial county of Somerset in 1996, though as B&NES is a unitary authority, it is not part of the area covered by Somerset County Council.

Charter trustees

Because Bath is unparished, there is no longer a city council (or parish council) – Bath City Council having ended in 1996 with the abolition of the district of Bath. The City of Bath's ceremonial functions, including its formal status as a city, its twinning arrangements, the mayoralty of Bath– which can be traced back to 1230– and control of the city's coat of arms, are maintained by the charter trustees of the City of Bath.

The councillors elected by the electoral wards that cover Bath (see below) are the trustees, and they elect one of their number as their chair and mayor. The mayor holds office for one municipal year and in modern times the mayor begins their term in office on the first Saturday in June, at a ceremony at Bath Abbey with a civic procession from and to the Guildhall. The 794th mayor, who began her office on 6 May 2021, is June Player. A deputy mayor is also elected.

Coat of arms
The coat of arms includes a depiction of the city wall, and two silver strips representing the River Avon and the hot springs. The sword of St. Paul is a link to Bath Abbey. The supporters, a lion and a bear, stand on a bed of acorns, a link to Bladud, the subject of the Legend of Bath. The knight's helmet indicates a municipality and the crown is that of King Edgar (referencing his coronation at the Abbey). A mural crown, indicating a city, is alternatively used instead of the helmet and Edgar's crown.

The Arms bear the motto "Aqvae Svlis", the Roman name for Bath in Latin script; although not on the Arms, the motto "Floreat Bathon" is sometimes used ("may Bath flourish" in Latin).

Bath Area Forum
Bath and North East Somerset Council has established the Bath City Forum, comprising B&NES councillors representing wards in Bath and up to 13 co-opted members drawn from the communities of the city. The first meeting of the Forum was held on 13 October 2015, at the Guildhall, where the first chair and vice-chair were elected. In 2021, this was re-launched as the Bath Area Forum.

Parliamentary elections

Bath is one of the oldest extant parliamentary constituencies in the United Kingdom, being in continuous existence since the Model Parliament of 1295. Before the Reform Act 1832, Bath elected two members to the unreformed House of Commons, as an ancient parliamentary borough. From 1832 until 1918 it elected two MPs and then was reduced to one.

Historically the constituency covered only the city of Bath, however it was enlarged into some outlying areas between 1997 and 2010. The constituency since 2010 once again covers exactly the city of Bath (it is co-extensive with the unparished area), and is currently represented by Liberal Democrat Wera Hobhouse who beat Conservative Ben Howlett at the 2017 general election and retained her seat at the 2019 general election. Howlett had replaced the retiring Liberal Democrat Don Foster at the 2015 general election. Foster's election was a notable result of the 1992 general election, as Chris Patten, the previous Member (and Cabinet Minister) played a major part, as Chairman of the Conservative Party, in re-electing the government of John Major, but failed to defend his marginal seat.

Electoral wards
The fifteen electoral wards of Bath are: Bathwick, Combe Down, Kingsmead, Lambridge, Lansdown, Moorlands, Newbridge, Odd Down, Oldfield Park, Southdown, Twerton, Walcot, Westmoreland, Weston and Widcombe & Lyncombe. These wards are co-extensive with the city, except that Newbridge includes also two parishes beyond the city boundary.

These wards return a total of 28 councillors to Bath and North East Somerset Council; all except two wards return two councillors (Moorlands and Oldfield Park return one each). The most recent elections were held on 2 May 2019 and all wards returned Liberal Democrats except for Westmoreland which returned independents.

Boundary changes enacted from 2 May 2019 included the abolition of Abbey ward, the merger of Lyncombe and Widcombe wards, the creation of Moorlands ward, and the replacement of Oldfield with Oldfield Park, as well as considerable changes to boundaries affecting all wards.

Geography and environment

Physical geography

The river, once an unnavigable series of braided streams broken up by swamps and ponds, has been managed by weirs into a single channel. Periodic flooding, which shortened the life of many buildings in the lowest part of the city, was normal until major flood control works were completed in the 1970s. Kensington Meadows is an area of mixed woodland and open meadow next to the river which has been designated as a local nature reserve.

Water bubbling up from the ground as geothermal springs originates as rain on the Mendip Hills. The rain percolates through limestone aquifers to a depth of between  where geothermal energy raises the water's temperature to between 64 and 96 °C (approximately 147–205 °F). Under pressure, the heated water rises to the surface along fissures and faults in the limestone. Hot water at a temperature of  rises here at the rate of  daily, from the Pennyquick geological fault.

In 1983, a new spa-water bore-hole was sunk, providing a clean and safe supply for drinking in the Pump Room. There is no universal definition to distinguish a hot spring from a geothermal spring, although, by several definitions, the Bath springs can be considered the only hot springs in the UK. Three of the springs feed the thermal baths.

Climate

Along with the rest of South West England, Bath has a temperate climate which is generally wetter and milder than the rest of the country. Seasonal temperature variation is less extreme than most of the United Kingdom because of the adjacent sea temperatures. In the summer, the Azores high pressure affects the south-west of England bringing fair weather; however, convective cloud sometimes forms inland, reducing the number of hours of sunshine. Annual sunshine rates are slightly less than the regional average of 1,600 hours.

In December 1998 there were 20 days without sun recorded at Yeovilton. Most of the rainfall in the south-west is caused by Atlantic depressions or by convection. Most of the rainfall in autumn and winter is caused by the Atlantic depressions, which is when they are most active. In summer, a large proportion of the rainfall is caused by sun heating the ground, leading to convection and to showers and thunderstorms. About 8–15 days of snowfall is typical. November to March have the highest mean wind speeds, and June to August have the lightest winds. The predominant wind direction is from the southwest.

Green belt 

Bath is fully enclosed by green belt as a part of a wider environmental and planning policy first designated in the late 1950s, and this extends into much of the surrounding district and beyond, helping to maintain local green space, prevent further urban sprawl and unplanned expansion towards Bristol and Bradford-on-Avon, as well as protecting smaller villages in between. Suburbs of the city bordering the green belt include Batheaston, Bathford, Bathampton, the University of Bath campus, Ensleigh, Twerton, Upper Weston, Odd Down, and Combe Down.

Parts of the Cotswolds AONB southern extent overlap the green belt north of the city, with other nearby landscape features and facilities within the green belt including the River Avon, Kennet and Avon Canal, Bath Racecourse, Bath Golf Club, Bathampton Down, Bathampton Meadow Nature Reserve, Bristol and Bath Railway Path, the Cotswold Way, Limestone Link route, Pennyquick Park, Little Solsbury Hill, and Primrose Hill.

Demography

District

According to the 2011 census, Bath, together with North East Somerset, which includes areas around Bath as far as the Chew Valley, had a population of 176,015. Demography shows according to the same statistics, the district is overwhelmingly populated by people of a white background at 94.6% – significantly higher than the national average of 87.17%. Other ethnic groups in the district, in order of population size, are multiracial at 1.6%, Asian at 2.6% and black at 0.8% (the national averages are 1.98%, 6.92% and 3.01%, respectively).

The district is largely Christian at 56.5%, with no other religion reaching more than 0.7%. These figures generally compare with the national averages, though the non-religious, at 32.7%, are significantly more prevalent than the national 25.67%. 83.9% of residents rated their health as good or very good, higher than the national level (81.40%). Nationally, 18% of people describe themselves as having a long-term illness; in Bath it is 16.10%.

City
The 2011 census recorded a population of 94,782 for the Bath built-up area and 88,859 for the unparished area (the city), with the latter exactly corresponding to the boundaries of the parliament constituency. The Bath built-up area extends slightly beyond the boundaries of the city itself, taking in areas to the northeast such as Bathampton and Bathford. The 2001 census figure for the city was 83,992. By 2019, the population was estimated at 90,000.

An inhabitant of Bath is known as a Bathonian.

The table below compares the city (the unparished area) of Bath with the unitary authority district as a whole (including the city) and South West England.

Economy

Industry
Bath once had an important manufacturing sector, particularly in crane manufacture, furniture manufacture, printing, brass foundries, quarries, dye works and Plasticine manufacture, as well as many mills. Significant Bath companies included Stothert & Pitt, Bath Cabinet Makers and Bath & Portland Stone.

Nowadays, manufacturing is in decline, but the city boasts strong software, publishing and service-oriented industries. The city's attraction to tourists has also led to a significant number of jobs in tourism-related industries. Important economic sectors in Bath include education and health (30,000 jobs), retail, tourism and leisure (14,000 jobs) and business and professional services (10,000 jobs).

Major employers are the National Health Service, the city's two universities, and the Bath and North East Somerset Council, as well as the Ministry of Defence although a number of MOD offices formerly in Bath have recently moved to Bristol. Growing employment sectors include information and communication technologies and creative and cultural industries where Bath is one of the recognised national centres for publishing, with the magazine and digital publisher Future plc employing around 650 people. Others include Buro Happold (400) and IPL Information Processing Limited (250). The city boasts over 400 retail shops, half of which are run by independent specialist retailers, and around 100 restaurants and cafes primarily supported by tourism.

Tourism

One of Bath's principal industries is tourism, with annually more than one million staying visitors and 3.8 million day visitors. The visits mainly fall into the categories of heritage tourism and cultural tourism, aided by the city's selection in 1987 as a World Heritage Site in recognition of its international cultural importance. All significant stages of the history of England are represented within the city, from the Roman Baths (including their significant Celtic presence), to Bath Abbey and the Royal Crescent, to the more recent Thermae Bath Spa.

The size of the tourist industry is reflected in the almost 300 places of accommodation – including more than 80 hotels, two of which have 'five-star' ratings, over 180 bed and breakfasts – many of which are located in Georgian buildings, and two campsites located on the western edge of the city. The city also has about 100 restaurants and a similar number of pubs and bars.

Several companies offer open top bus tours around the city, as well as tours on foot and on the river. Since the opening of Thermae Bath Spa in 2006, the city has attempted to recapture its historical position as the only town or city in the United Kingdom offering visitors the opportunity to bathe in naturally heated spring waters.

In the 2010 Google Street View Best Streets Awards, the Royal Crescent took second place in the "Britain's Most Picturesque Street" award, first place being given to The Shambles in York. Milsom Street was also awarded "Britain's Best Fashion Street" in the 11,000-strong vote.

Architecture

There are many Roman archaeological sites throughout the central area of the city. Around the hot springs, Roman foundations, pillar bases, and baths can still be seen, however all the stonework above the level of the baths is from more recent periods.

Bath Abbey was a Norman church built on earlier foundations. The present building dates from the early 16th century and shows a late Perpendicular style with flying buttresses and crocketed pinnacles decorating a crenellated and pierced parapet. The choir and transepts have a fan vault by Robert and William Vertue. A matching vault was added to the nave in the 19th century. The building is lit by 52 windows.

Most buildings in Bath are made from the local, golden-coloured Bath stone, and many date from the 18th and 19th century. The dominant style of architecture in Central Bath is Georgian; this style evolved from the Palladian revival style that became popular in the early 18th century. Many of the prominent architects of the day were employed in the development of the city. The original purpose of much of Bath's architecture is concealed by the honey-coloured classical façades; in an era before the advent of the luxury hotel, these apparently elegant residences were frequently purpose-built lodging houses, where visitors could hire a room, a floor, or (according to their means) an entire house for the duration of their visit, and be waited on by the house's communal servants. The masons Reeves of Bath were prominent in the city from the 1770s to 1860s.

The Circus consists of three long, curved terraces designed by the elder John Wood to form a circular space or theatre intended for civic functions and games. The games give a clue to the design, the inspiration behind which was the Colosseum in Rome. Like the Colosseum, the three façades have a different order of architecture on each floor: Doric on the ground level, then Ionic on the piano nobile, and finishing with Corinthian on the upper floor, the style of the building thus becoming progressively more ornate as it rises. Wood never lived to see his unique example of town planning completed as he died five days after personally laying the foundation stone on 18 May 1754.

The most spectacular of Bath's terraces is the Royal Crescent, built between 1767 and 1774 and designed by the younger John Wood. Wood designed the great curved façade of what appears to be about 30 houses with Ionic columns on a rusticated ground floor, but that was the extent of his input: each purchaser bought a certain length of the façade, and then employed their own architect to build a house to their own specifications behind it; hence what appears to be two houses is in some cases just one. This system of town planning is betrayed at the rear of the crescent: while the front is completely uniform and symmetrical, the rear is a mixture of differing roof heights, juxtapositions and fenestration. The "Queen Anne fronts and Mary-Anne backs" architecture occurs repeatedly in Bath and was designed to keep hired women at the back of the house. Other fine terraces elsewhere in the city include Lansdown Crescent and Somerset Place on the northern hill.

Around 1770 the neoclassical architect Robert Adam designed Pulteney Bridge, using as the prototype for the three-arched bridge spanning the Avon an original, but unused, design by Andrea Palladio for the Rialto Bridge in Venice. Thus, Pulteney Bridge became not just a means of crossing the river, but also a shopping arcade. Along with the Rialto Bridge and the Ponte Vecchio in Florence, which it resembles, it is one of the very few surviving bridges in Europe to serve this dual purpose. It has been substantially altered since it was built. The bridge was named after Frances and William Pulteney, the owners of the Bathwick estate for which the bridge provided a link to the rest of Bath. 
The Georgian streets in the vicinity of the river tended to be built high above the original ground level to avoid flooding, with the carriageways supported on vaults extending in front of the houses. This can be seen in the multi-storey cellars around Laura Place south of Pulteney Bridge, in the colonnades below Grand Parade, and in the grated coal holes in the pavement of North Parade. In some parts of the city, such as George Street, and London Road near Cleveland Bridge, the developers of the opposite side of the road did not match this pattern, leaving raised pavements with the ends of the vaults exposed to a lower street below.

The heart of the Georgian city was the Pump Room, which, together with its associated Lower Assembly Rooms, was designed by Thomas Baldwin, a local builder responsible for many other buildings in the city, including the terraces in Argyle Street and the Guildhall. Baldwin rose rapidly, becoming a leader in Bath's architectural history.

In 1776, he was made the chief City Surveyor, and Bath City Architect.

In the 1960s and early 1970s some parts of Bath were unsympathetically redeveloped, resulting in the loss of some 18th- and 19th-century buildings. This process was largely halted by a popular campaign which drew strength from the publication of Adam Fergusson's The Sack of Bath. Controversy has revived periodically, most recently with the demolition of the 1930s Churchill House, a neo-Georgian municipal building originally housing the Electricity Board, to make way for a new bus station. This is part of the Southgate redevelopment in which an ill-favoured 1960s shopping precinct, bus station and multi-storey car park were demolished and replaced by a new area of neo-Georgian shopping streets.

As a result of this and other changes, notably plans for abandoned industrial land along the Avon, the city's status as a World Heritage Site was reviewed by UNESCO in 2009. The decision was made to let Bath keep its status, but UNESCO asked to be consulted on future phases of the Riverside development, saying that the density and volume of buildings in the second and third phases of the development need to be reconsidered. It also demanded Bath do more to attract world-class architecture in new developments.

In 2021, Bath received its second UNESCO World Heritage inscription, becoming part of a group of 11 spa towns across seven countries that were listed by UNESCO as the "Great Spas of Europe".

Culture

Bath became the centre of fashionable life in England during the 18th century when its Old Orchard Street Theatre and architectural developments such as Lansdown Crescent, the Royal Crescent, The Circus, and Pulteney Bridge were built.

Bath's five theatres – Theatre Royal, Ustinov Studio, the Egg, the Rondo Theatre, and the Mission Theatre – attract internationally renowned companies and directors and an annual season by Sir Peter Hall. The city has a long-standing musical tradition; Bath Abbey, home to the Klais Organ and the largest concert venue in the city, stages about 20 concerts and 26 organ recitals each year. Another concert venue, the 1,600-seat art deco The Forum, originated as a cinema. The city holds the annual Bath International Music Festival and Mozartfest, the annual Bath Literature Festival (and its counterpart for children), the Bath Film Festival, the Bath Digital Festival. the Bath Fringe Festival, the Bath Beer Festival and the Bath Chilli Festival. The Bach Festivals occur at two and a half-year intervals. An annual Bard of Bath competition aims to find the best poet, singer or storyteller.

The city is home to the Victoria Art Gallery, the Museum of East Asian Art, and Holburne Museum, numerous commercial art galleries and antique shops, as well as a number of other museums, among them Bath Postal Museum, the Fashion Museum, the Jane Austen Centre, the Herschel Museum of Astronomy and the Roman Baths. The Bath Royal Literary and Scientific Institution (BRLSI) in Queen Square was founded in 1824 from the Society for the encouragement of Agriculture, Planting, Manufactures, Commerce and the Fine Arts founded in 1777. In September 1864, BRLSI hosted the 34th annual meeting of the British Science Association, which was attended by explorers David Livingstone, Sir Richard Francis Burton, and John Hanning Speke. The history of the city is displayed at the Museum of Bath Architecture, which is housed in a building built in 1765 as the Trinity Presbyterian Church. It was also known as the Countess of Huntingdon's Chapel, as she lived in the attached house from 1707 to 1791.

The arts

During the 18th century Thomas Gainsborough and Sir Thomas Lawrence lived and worked in Bath. John Maggs, a painter best known for coaching scenes, was born and lived in Bath with his artistic family.

Jane Austen lived there from 1801 with her father, mother and sister Cassandra, and the family resided at four different addresses until 1806. Jane Austen never liked the city, and wrote to Cassandra, "It will be two years tomorrow since we left Bath for Clifton, with what happy feelings of escape." Bath has honoured her name with the Jane Austen Centre and a city walk. Austen's Northanger Abbey and Persuasion are set in the city and describe taking the waters, social life, and music recitals.

William Friese-Greene experimented with celluloid and motion pictures in his studio in the 1870s, developing some of the earliest movie camera technology. He is credited as being one of the inventors of cinematography.

Satirist and political journalist William Hone was born in Bath in 1780.

Taking the waters is described in Charles Dickens' novel The Pickwick Papers in which Pickwick's servant, Sam Weller, comments that the water has "a very strong flavour o' warm flat irons". The Royal Crescent is the venue for a chase between two characters, Dowler and Winkle. Moyra Caldecott's novel The Waters of Sul is set in Roman Bath in AD 72, and The Regency Detective, by David Lassman and Terence James, revolves around the exploits of Jack Swann investigating deaths in the city during the early 19th century. Richard Brinsley Sheridan's play The Rivals takes place in the city, as does Roald Dahl's chilling short story, The Landlady.

Many films and television programmes have been filmed using its architecture as the backdrop, including the 2004 film of Thackeray's Vanity Fair, The Duchess (2008), The Elusive Pimpernel (1950) and The Titfield Thunderbolt (1953). In 2012, Pulteney Weir was used as a replacement location during post production of the film adaptation of Les Misérables. Stunt shots were filmed in October 2012 after footage acquired during the main filming period was found to have errors. The ITV police drama McDonald and Dodds is set and mostly filmed in Bath using many of the city's famous sites.

In August 2003 The Three Tenors sang at a concert to mark the opening of the Thermae Bath Spa, a new hot water spa in the city centre, but delays to the project meant the spa actually opened three years later on 7 August 2006. In 2008, 104 decorated pigs were displayed around the city in a public art event called "King Bladud's Pigs in Bath". It celebrated the city, its origins and artists. Decorated pig sculptures were displayed throughout the summer and were auctioned to raise funds for Two Tunnels Greenway.

Parks

Royal Victoria Park, a short walk from the city centre, was opened in 1830 by the 11-year-old Princess Victoria, and was the first park to carry her name. It has a skatepark, tennis courts, a bowling green, a putting green and a 12- and 18-hole golf course, a pond, open-air concerts, an annual travelling funfair at Easter, and a children's play area. Much of its area is lawn; a notable feature is a ha-ha that segregates it from the Royal Crescent while giving the impression from the Crescent of uninterrupted grassland across the park to Royal Avenue. It has a "Green Flag Award", the national standard for parks and green spaces in England and Wales, and is registered by English Heritage as of National Historic Importance. The  botanical gardens were formed in 1887 and contain one of the finest collections of plants on limestone in the West Country.

A replica Roman Temple was built at the British Empire Exhibition at Wembley in 1924, and, following the exhibition, was dismantled and rebuilt in Victoria Park in Bath. In 1987, the gardens were extended to include the Great Dell, a disused quarry with a collection of conifers.

Other parks include Alexandra Park on a hill overlooking the city; Parade Gardens, along the river near the abbey in the city centre; Sydney Gardens, an 18th-century pleasure garden; Henrietta Park; Hedgemead Park; and Alice Park. Jane Austen wrote "It would be pleasant to be near the Sydney Gardens. We could go into the Labyrinth every day." Alexandra, Alice and Henrietta parks were built into the growing city among the housing developments. Linear Park is built on the old Somerset and Dorset Joint Railway line, and connects with the Two Tunnels Greenway which contains the longest cycling and walking tunnel in the UK. Cleveland Pools were built around 1815 close to the River Avon, now the oldest surviving public outdoor lido in England, and plans have been submitted for its restoration.

Queen Victoria
Victoria Art Gallery and Royal Victoria Park are named after Queen Victoria, who wrote in her journal "The people are really too kind to me." This feeling seemed to have been reciprocated by the people of Bath: "Lord James O'Brien brought a drawing of the intended pillar which the people of Bath are so kind as to erect in commemoration of my 18th birthday."

Food

Several foods have an association with the city. Sally Lunn buns (a type of teacake) have long been baked in Bath. They were first mentioned by name in verses printed in the Bath Chronicle, in 1772. At that time they were eaten hot at public breakfasts in Spring Gardens. They can be eaten with sweet or savoury toppings and are sometimes confused with Bath buns, which are smaller, round, very sweet and very rich. They were associated with the city following The Great Exhibition. Bath buns were originally topped with crushed comfits created by dipping caraway seeds repeatedly in boiling sugar; but today seeds are added to a 'London Bath Bun' (a reference to the bun's promotion and sale at the Great Exhibition). The seeds may be replaced by crushed sugar granules or 'nibs'.

Bath has lent its name to one other distinctive recipe – Bath Olivers – a dry baked biscuit invented by Dr William Oliver, physician to the Mineral Water Hospital in 1740. Oliver was an anti-obesity campaigner and author of a "Practical Essay on the Use and Abuse of warm Bathing in Gluty Cases". In more recent years, Oliver's efforts have been traduced by the introduction of a version of the biscuit with a plain chocolate coating. Bath Chaps, the salted and smoked cheek and jawbones of the pig, takes its name from the city and is available from a stall in the daily covered market. Bath Ales brewery is located in Warmley and Abbey Ales are brewed in the city.

Twinning
Bath is twinned with four other cities in Europe. Twinning is the responsibility of the Charter Trustees and each twinning arrangement is managed by a Twinning Association.

There is also a historic connection with Manly, New South Wales, Australia, which is referred to as a sister city, and there is a partnership arrangement with Beppu, Ōita Prefecture, Japan.

Formal twinning
Aix-en-Provence, France
Alkmaar, Netherlands
Braunschweig, Germany
Kaposvár, Hungary

Education

Bath has two universities, the University of Bath and Bath Spa University. Established in 1966, the University of Bath was named University of the Year by The Sunday Times in 2011. It offers programs in politics, languages, the physical sciences, engineering, mathematics, architecture, management and technology.

Bath Spa University was first granted degree-awarding powers in 1992 as a university college before being granted university status in August 2005. It offers courses leading to a Postgraduate Certificate in Education. It has schools in the following subject areas: Art and Design, Education, English and Creative Studies, Historical and Cultural Studies, Music and the Performing Arts, Science and the Environment and Social Sciences.

Bath College offers further education, and Norland College provides education and training in childcare.

Sport

Rugby

Bath Rugby is a rugby union team in the Premiership league. It plays in blue, white and black kit at the Recreation Ground in the city, where it has been since the late 19th century, following its establishment in 1865. The team's first major honour was winning the John Player Cup, now sponsored as the LV Cup and also known as the Anglo-Welsh Cup, four years consecutively from 1984 until 1987. The team then led the Courage league in six seasons in eight years between 1988 and 1989 and 1995–96, during which time it also won the renamed Pilkington Cup in 1989, 1990, 1992, 1994, 1995 and 1996. It finally won the Heineken Cup in the 1997–98 season, and topped the Zürich Premiership (now Gallagher Premiership) in 2003–04. The team's squad includes several members who also play, or have played in the English national team, including Lee Mears, Rob Webber, Dave Attwood, Nick Abendanon and Matt Banahan. Colston's School, Bristol, has had a large input in the team over the past decade, providing several current 1st XV squad members. The former England Rugby Team Manager and former Scotland national coach Andy Robinson used to play for Bath Rugby team and was captain and later coach. Both of Robinson's predecessors, Clive Woodward and Jack Rowell, as well as his successor Brian Ashton, were also former Bath coaches and managers.

Football

Bath City F.C. is the semi-professional football team. Founded in 1889, the club has played their home matches at Twerton Park since 1932. Bath City's history is entirely in non-league football, predominantly in the 5th tier. Bath narrowly missed out on election to the Football League by a few votes in 1978 and again in 1985. The club have a good history in the FA Cup, reaching the third round six times. The record attendance, 18,020, at the ground was in 1960 against Brighton. The club’s colours are black and white and their official nickname is “The Romans", stemming from Bath’s Ancient Roman history.  The club is sometimes called “The Stripes", referring to their striped kit.

Until 2009 Team Bath F.C. operated as an affiliate to the University Athletics programme. In 2002, Team Bath became the first university team to enter the FA Cup in 120 years, and advanced through four qualifying rounds to the first round proper. The university's team was established in 1999 while the city team has existed since before 1908 (when it entered the Western League). However, in 2009, the Football Conference ruled that Team Bath would not be eligible to gain promotion to a National division, nor were they allowed to participate in Football Association cup competitions. This ruling led to the decision by the club to fold at the end of the 2008–09 Conference South competition. In their final season, Team Bath F.C. finished 11th in the league.

Bath also has Non-League football clubs Odd Down F.C. who play at the Lew Hill Memorial Ground and Larkhall Athletic F.C. who play at Plain Ham.

Other sports
Many cricket clubs are based in the city, including Bath Cricket Club, who are based at the North Parade Ground and play in the West of England Premier League. Cricket is also played on the Recreation Ground, just across from the rugby club. The Recreation Ground is also home to Bath Croquet Club, which was re-formed in 1976 and is affiliated with the South West Federation of Croquet Clubs.

The Bath Half Marathon is run annually through the city streets, with over 10,000 runners.

TeamBath is the umbrella name for all of the University of Bath sports teams, including the aforementioned football club. Other sports for which TeamBath is noted are athletics, badminton, basketball, bob skeleton, bobsleigh, hockey, judo, modern pentathlon, netball, rugby union, swimming, tennis, triathlon and volleyball. The City of Bath Triathlon takes place annually at the university.

Bath Roller Derby Girls (BRDG) is Bath's only flat track roller derby club. Founded in 2012, they compete in the British Roller Derby Championships Tier 3. As of 2015, they are full members of the United Kingdom Roller Derby Association (UKRDA.)

Bath is home to a table tennis League, made up of 3 divisions and a number of clubs based in Bath and the surrounding area.

Transport

Roads

The potential new junction 18a linking the M4 motorway with the A4174 Avon Ring Road will provide an additional direct route from Bath to the motorway. The city introduced a Class C Clean Air Zone on 15 March 2021, which charges the most polluting vehicles £9 per day (and up to £100 per day for coaches and HGVs) to drive in the city centre. It is the first pollution road charging zone outside London in the UK.

In an attempt to reduce the level of car use, park and ride schemes have been introduced, with sites at Odd Down, Lansdown and Newbridge. A very large increase in city centre parking was also provided under the new SouthGate shopping centre development, which necessarily introduces more car traffic. In addition, a bus gate scheme in Northgate aims to reduce private car use in the city centre. National Express operates coach services from Bath bus station to a number of cities. Bath also has a network of bus routes run by First West of England, with services to surrounding towns and cities, such as Bristol, Corsham, Chippenham, Devizes, Salisbury, Frome and Wells. Faresaver Bus company also operate numerous services to surrounding towns. The Bath Bus Company runs open top double-decker bus tours around the city, as well as frequent services to Bristol Airport. Stagecoach West also provides services to Tetbury and the South Cotswolds.

A transportation study (the Bristol/Bath to South Coast Study) was published in 2004 after being initiated by the Government Office for the South West and Bath and North East Somerset Council and undertaken by WSP Global as a result of the de-trunking in 1999 of the A36/A46 trunk road network from Bath to Southampton.

Rivers and canals
The city is connected to Bristol and the sea by the River Avon, navigable via locks by small boats. The river was connected to the River Thames and London by the Kennet and Avon Canal in 1810 via Bath Locks; this waterway – closed for many years but restored in the last years of the 20th century – is now popular with narrowboat users.

Cycling
Bath is on National Cycle Route 4, with one of Britain's first cycleways, the Bristol and Bath Railway Path, to the west, and an eastern route toward London on the canal towpath. Bath also benefits from several bridleways and byways.

Railways

Bath is served by the Bath Spa railway station (designed by Isambard Kingdom Brunel), which has regular connections to London Paddington, Bristol Temple Meads, Cardiff Central, Cheltenham, Exeter, Plymouth and Penzance (see Great Western Main Line), and also Westbury, Warminster, Weymouth, Salisbury, Southampton, Portsmouth and Brighton (see Wessex Main Line). Services are provided by Great Western Railway. There is a suburban station on the main line, Oldfield Park, which has a limited commuter service to Bristol as well as other destinations.

Green Park Station was once the terminus of the Midland Railway, and junction for the Somerset and Dorset Joint Railway, whose line, always steam hauled, went through the Devonshire tunnel (under the Wellsway, St Luke's Church and the Devonshire Arms), through the Combe Down Tunnel and climbed over the Mendips to serve many towns and villages on its  run to Bournemouth. This example of an English rural line was closed by Beeching in March 1966. Its Bath station building, now restored, houses shops, small businesses, the Saturday Bath Farmers Market and parking for a supermarket, while the route of the Somerset and Dorset within Bath has been reused for the Two Tunnels Greenway, a shared use path that extends National Cycle Route 24 into the city.

Trams

Historical
The Bath Tramways Company was introduced in the late 19th century, opening on 24 December 1880. The  gauge cars were horse-drawn along a route from London Road to the Bath Spa railway station, but the system closed in 1902. It was replaced by electric tram cars on a greatly expanded  gauge system that opened in 1904. There was a fleet of 40 cars, all but 6 being double deck. The first line to close was replaced by a bus service in 1938, and the last went on 6 May 1939.

Possible re-introduction
In 2005, a detailed plan was created and presented to the council to re-introduce trams to Bath, but the plan did not proceed, reportedly due to the focus by the council on the government-supported busway planned to run from the Newbridge park and ride into the city centre. Part of the justification for the proposed tram reintroduction plan was the pollution from vehicles within the city, which was twice the legal levels, and the heavy traffic congestion due to high car usage. In 2015 another group, Bath Trams building on the earlier tram group proposals has created interest in the idea of re-introducing trams with several public meetings and meetings with the council. In 2017, Bath and North East Somerset Council announced a feasibility study, due to be published by March 2018, into implementing a light rail or tram system in the city.

In November 2016, the West of England Local Enterprise Partnership began a consultation process on their Transport Vision Summary Document, outlining potential light rail/tram routes in the region, one of which being a route from Bristol city centre along the A4 road to Bath to relieve pressure on bus and rail services between the two cities.

Media
Bath's local newspaper is the Bath Chronicle, owned by Local World. Published since 1760, the Chronicle was a daily newspaper until mid-September 2007, when it became a weekly. Since 2018 its website has been operated by Trinity Mirror's Somerset Live platform.

The BBC Bristol website has featured coverage of news and events within Bath since 2003.

For television, Bath is served by the BBC West studios based in Bristol, and by ITV West Country, formerly HTV, also from studios in Bristol.

Radio stations broadcasting to the city include BBC Radio Bristol which has a studio in Kingsmead Square in the city centre, BBC Radio Somerset in Taunton, Greatest Hits Radio Bristol & The South West on 107.9FM and Heart West, formerly GWR FM, as well as The University of Bath's University Radio Bath, a student-focused radio station available on campus and also online.
Launched in 2019, BA1 Radio is an online community radio station.

See also 

 The Bathonian Age (168.3 – 166.1 million years ago), a Jurassic Period of geological time named after Bath
 Grade I listed buildings in Bath and North East Somerset
 List of people from Bath
 List of spa towns in the United Kingdom
 Bath, Ontario, named after Bath, Somerset, and now part of Loyalist, Ontario

References

External links 

 
 Official tourist information
 Mayor of Bath
 
 

 
Cities in South West England
Towns in Bath and North East Somerset
Former non-metropolitan districts of Avon
Spa towns in England
World Heritage Sites in England
River Avon, Bristol
 
Unparished areas in Somerset
Geographical articles missing image alternative text
Former boroughs in England